Duets: Friends & Legends is a studio album by Canadian country artist Anne Murray. The album features seventeen of Anne's best-known songs re-recorded as duets with her favourite female singers. While the record mostly consists of new studio tracks, Anne's duet with Celine Dion on "When I Fall in Love" was taken from a 1996 TV special. The late Dusty Springfield's vocal on "I Just Fall in Love Again" was lifted from Springfield's 1978 recording of the track.

The album was released in Canada on November 13, 2007, where it reached #4 on the Canadian Albums Chart and has since been certified 2× Platinum (200,000 albums sold) in that country. It received two nominations at the 2008 Juno Awards (Album of the Year and Pop Album of the Year), although it was originally omitted from the Album of the Year category after a calculation error.

Anne Murray - Friends & Legends is also the title of a one-hour television special produced for CBC Television by Out to See Entertainment Inc. The show features duets by Anne Murray with her daughter Dawn Langstroth, Jann Arden and various other artists.

In the United States, the album was released on January 15, 2008, and peaked at #42 on the Billboard 200 as well as #8 on the Top Country Albums chart.  As of 2016, the album has sold approximately 300,000 copies in the United States.

This is Anne's final album of wholly new recordings.  The following year, Anne made her final studio recordings—four new tracks for the compilation Anne Murray's Christmas Album,  which consisted mostly of previously released material.

Tour
To promote the album, Murray embarked on the 'Coast-to-Coast – One Last Time' tour.

Track listing

Personnel

Musicians 
Rhythm Section
 Steve Nathan – keyboards (1, 2, 3)
 Lou Pomanti – acoustic piano (4-7, 17), electric piano (4-7, 17), organ (4-7, 17)
 Doug Riley – keyboards (4-7, 17)
 Jim Cox – keyboards (8-12), rhythm arrangements (8-12)
 Rob Mathes – keyboards (13, 14, 15), Hammond B3 organ (13, 14, 15), acoustic guitar (13, 14, 15), 12-string guitar (13, 14, 15)
 Chris Caswell – additional keyboards (13, 14, 15)
 Gil Goldstein – accordion (13, 14, 15)
 Brian Gatto – keyboards (16)
 Steve Sexton – keyboards (16)
 Brent Mason – electric guitar (1, 2, 3)
 Biff Watson – acoustic guitar (1, 2, 3)
 Michael 'Pepe' Francis – guitar (4-7, 17)
 Dean Parks – guitar (8-12)
 Billy Masters – electric guitar (13, 14, 15)
 Georges Hébert – guitar (16)
 Aidan Mason – guitar (16)
 Michael Rhodes – bass (1, 2, 3)
 Peter Cardinali – bass (4-7, 17)
 Kevin Axt – bass (8, 9)
 David Finck – bass (13, 14, 15)
 Peter Bleakney – bass (16)
 Eddie Bayers – drums (1, 2, 3)
 Barry Keane – drums (4-7), percussion (4-7)
 Gregg Field – drums (8-12)
 Shawn Pelton – drums (13, 14, 15)
 Gary Craig – drums (16)

Brass and Woodwinds
 Gil Goldstein – arrangements and conductor 
 Rob Mathes – arrangements and conductor 
 Andy Snitzer – alto saxophone
 George Flynn – bass trombone
 Birch Johnson – tenor trombone
 Tony Kadleck – trumpet
 Jeff Kievit – trumpet
 Chris Hall – tuba
 Katherine Fink – alto flute
 Liz Mann - alto flute
 Pamela Sklar – bass flute
 David Weiss – bass flute
 Virgil Blackwell – bass clarinet
 Diane Lesser – English horn
 Bob Carlisle – French horn
 Philip Myers – French horn

String Section
 Gil Goldstein – arrangements and conductor 
 Rob Mathes – arrangements and conductor 
 Jill Dell'Abate – contractor 
 Elena Barere – concertmaster 
Cello 
 Diane Barere
 Jeanne LeBlanc 
 Richard Locker 
Viola
 Irene Breslaw
 Desiree Elsevier
 Vincent Lionti
 Craig Mumm
Violin
 Abe Appleman
 Elena Barere
 Eva Burmeister
 David Chan
 Enrico DiCecco
 Jonathan Dinklage
 Katherine Fong
 Ann Leathers
 Laura McGinniss
 Catherine Ro
 Ricky Sortomme
 Sylvia Danburg Vlope
 Carol Webb
 Hae Young Ham

Backing Vocals 
 Dawn Langstroth (3, 10)
 Will Langstroth (10)
 Anne Murray (10)

Choir on Track 17
 Peter Cardinali
 Michael Francis
 Barry Keane
 Nathan Moore
 Bruno Moynie
 Raine Munro
 Jeff Pelletier
 Lou Pomanti
 Anastasia Saradoc
 Qadi Soraya

Production 
 Phil Ramone – producer (Tracks 1-15 & 17)
 Robert John "Mutt" Lange – vocal producer for Shania Twain (Track 10)
 Anne Murray – producer (Track 16)
 Steve Sexton – pre-production
 Portia Gauthier – production assistance
 Jill Dell'Abate – production manager 
 Patrick Duffy – art direction, design 
 Monic Richard – photography 
 P'tricia – hair, manicure 
 Dany Cournoyer – make-up 
 Bruce Allen – management 
 Larry LeBlanc – liner notes 

Technical
 Jeff Balding – recording 
 Frank Filipetti – recording, brass/string/woodwind recording, mixing
 Al Schmitt – recording 
 Jeff Wolpert – recording 
 Olle Romo – vocal recording (Shania Twain on Track 10)
 George Seara – additional vocal engineer (Track 13)
 Glenn Matullo – vocal recording (Indigo Girls on Track 14)
 Peter Hamilton – recording (Track 16)
 Doug McClement – recording (Track 16)
 Kevin Doyle – mixing (Track 16)
 Luiz Breves – assistant engineer
 Allen Ditto – assistant engineer
 Steve Genewick – assistant engineer, Pro Tools operator
 Don Goodrick – assistant engineer
 Chris Jennings – assistant engineer
 Greg Kolchinsky – assistant engineer
 Missy Webb – assistant engineer, mix assistant 
 Bob Ludwig – mastering 

Studios 
 Recorded at Orphan Studios (Atlanta, GA); Blackbird Studios (Nashville, TN); Capitol Studios (Hollywood, CA); Legacy Recording Studios (New York, NY); Phase One Studios and The Orange Lounge (Toronto, Ontario, Canada).
 Mastered at Gateway Mastering (Portland, ME).

Charts

Weekly charts

Year-end charts

References 

2007 albums
2008 albums
Anne Murray albums
Albums produced by Phil Ramone
Albums produced by Robert John "Mutt" Lange
Manhattan Records albums
Vocal duet albums